Golden House, or Domus Aurea, was a large palace built by the Emperor Nero in the heart of ancient Rome.

Golden House or The Golden House may also refer to:

 The Golden House, a tourist attraction in Hong Kong
 The Golden House (novel), a 2017 novel by Salman Rushdie
 Golden House (TV series), a 2010 South Korean television series
 C. S. Golden House, a historic house in Thomaston, Alabama
 Ca' d'Oro, in Venice, Italy

See also
 
 Golden Palace (disambiguation)